Luton power station supplied electricity to the Borough of Luton and the surrounding area from 1901 to 1969. The power station was operated by the Luton Corporation until the nationalisation of the British electricity industry in 1948. It was redeveloped after the First World War to meet the increased demand for electricity.

History
Luton Corporation obtained a Provisional Order in 1895 under the Electric Lighting Acts to generate and supply electricity to Borough of Luton. The Order was granted by the Board of Trade and was confirmed by Parliament through the Electric Lighting Orders Confirmation (No. 2) Act 1895 (58 & 59 Vict. c. lxvii). The corporation built a power station in St Mary's Road, Luton (51°52’45”N, 00°24’34”W) which was commissioned in 1901.

Luton power station supplied electricity to Luton Corporation Tramways from the opening of the system in 1908 until its closure in 1932.

The British electricity supply industry was nationalised in 1948 under the provisions of the Electricity Act 1947 (10 & 11 Geo. 6 c. 54). The Luton electricity undertaking was abolished, ownership of Luton power station was vested in the British Electricity Authority, and subsequently the Central Electricity Authority and the Central Electricity Generating Board (CEGB). At the same time the electricity distribution and sales responsibilities of the Luton electricity undertaking were transferred to the Eastern Electricity Board (EEB).

Luton power station was closed in 1969. The power station was demolished in 1972.

Equipment specification

Plant in 1923
By 1923 the plant comprised boilers delivering 166,000 lb/h (20.9 kg/s) of steam to:

 1 × 350 kW reciprocating engine driving direct current (DC) generator
 2 × 500 kW reciprocating engines DC generators
 1 × 400 kW steam turbine DC generator
 1 × 650 kW steam turbine DC generator
 2 × 1,000 kW steam turbo-alternators, alternating current (AC)
 1 × 3,000 kW steam turbo-alternator AC

These machines had a total generating capacity of 7,400 kW; comprising 2,400 kW DC and 5,000 kW AC.

Electricity supply to consumers was at 250 and 500 V DC.

Plant in 1954
By 1954 the plant comprised:

 Boilers:
 2 × Woodeson 90,000 lb/h (11.34 kg/s) pulverised fuel boilers, steam conditions were 325 psi and 700 °F (22.4 bar and 371 °C), steam was supplied to:
 Generators:
 1 × 5 MW Brush-Ljungstrom 6.6 kV turbo-alternator
 1 × 7 MW Brush-Ljungstrom 6.6 kV turbo-alternator
 1 × 11 MW Brush-Ljungstrom 6.6 kV turbo-alternator

The total generating capacity was 23 MW and the output capacity was 13 MW.

Condenser water was cooled in two Mouchel reinforced concrete cooling towers each with a capacity of 1.0 million gallons per hour (4,546 m3/hour).

The boilers were converted to oil firing in 1965.

Operations

Operating data 1921–23
The electricity supply data for the period 1921–23 was:

The electricity Loads on the system were:

Revenue from the sale of current (in 1923) was £75,852; the surplus of revenue over expenses was £33,664.

Operating data 1946
In 1946 Luton power station supplied 30,831 MWh of electricity; the maximum output load was 18,390 kW; the load factor was 49.5 per cent; the thermal efficiency was 14.60 per cent.

Operating data 1954–67
Operating data for the period 1954–67 was:

The output of the station in MWh was as follows.

Luton Electricity District
Following nationalisation in 1948 Luton power station became part of the Luton electricity supply district, covering 200 square miles (518 km2) with a population of 193,800 in 1958.

The number of consumers and electricity sold in the Luton district was:

In 1958 the number of units sold to categories of consumers was:

See also
 Timeline of the UK electricity supply industry
 List of power stations in England

References

External links 
 Luton Past - Chapter 4 - The Utilities - by Ken Cooper The story of Luton's gas, railway, water and electricity services

Coal-fired power stations in England
Demolished power stations in the United Kingdom